Kuhrt (also Kührt) is a surname. Notable people with the surname include:

 Amélie Kuhrt (born 1944), British historian
 Gordon Kuhrt (born 1941), British priest and author
 Veit Kührt (born 1940), German ski jumper

See also
 Jacob Kuhrts (1832–1926)
 Kurt (surname)